Brookfield (Cumbria) railway station was a short-lived railway station that served Brookfield School (or Brookfield Academy), a Quaker school situated to the west of Wigton, England, for a few weeks in 1844–45.

It was opened on 2 December 1844 by the Maryport and Carlisle Railway, and closed on 10 February 1845.

References

External links
Site of Brookfield Station on navigable 1947 O.S. map

Disused railway stations in Cumbria
Former Maryport and Carlisle Railway stations
Railway stations in Great Britain opened in 1844
Railway stations in Great Britain closed in 1845